Cheshmeh Pahn or Cheshmeh-ye Pahn or Chashmeh Pahn may refer to:
 Cheshmeh Pahn, Hamadan
 Cheshmeh Pahn-e Nanaj, Hamadan Province
 Cheshmeh Pahn, Malekshahi, Ilam Province
 Cheshmeh Pahn, Shirvan and Chardaval, Ilam Province
 Cheshmeh Pahn-e Alishah, Kermanshah Province
 Cheshmeh Pahn-e Fereydun, Kermanshah Province
 Cheshmeh Pahn-e Rashid, Kermanshah Province
 Cheshmeh Pahn-e Dasht Rum, Kohgiluyeh and Boyer-Ahmad Province
 Cheshmeh Pahn Ganjegan, Kohgiluyeh and Boyer-Ahmad Province
 Cheshmeh Pahn, Markazi